John William Green (28 August 1887 - 6 May 1963) was an Australian rules footballer who played for Geelong and Collingwood in the Victorian Football League (VFL).

Green played two games for Geelong in 1908. After two seasons out of the VFL, Green played a further eight seasons for Collingwood from 1911 to 1918.

Green played in four Grand Finals for Collingwood, including the 1917 win against Fitzroy.

Green is one of four Jack Green's to have played VFL/AFL football.

He is not to be confused with:
Jack Green who played 126 games with Carlton and Hawthorn from 1929 to 1936.
Jack Green who played 127 games with Collingwood from 1938 to 1949.
Jack Green who played 18 games with Collingwood from 1967 to 1969

References

1887 births
Collingwood Football Club players
Collingwood Football Club Premiership players
Geelong Football Club players
Australian rules footballers from Victoria (Australia)
1963 deaths
One-time VFL/AFL Premiership players